Moa is both a surname and a given name. Notable people with the name include:

Surname:
Anika Moa (born 1980), New Zealand singer-songwriter
Taniela Moa (born 1985), Tongan rugby player
Sam Moa (born 1986), Tongan rugby player
Pío Moa (born 1945), Spanish writer and journalist
Iyasus Mo'a (1214–1294), saint of the Ethiopian Orthodox Tewahedo Church

Given name:
Moa Arimoto (born 1986), Japanese actress and model
Moa Iwano (born 2004), Japanese figure skater
Moa Kikuchi (born 1999), also known as MOAMETAL, is a Japanese idol, singer and model
Moa Martinson (1890–1964), Swedish author

See also
Eber Moas (born 1969), football player from Uruguay

Japanese feminine given names